The 2021 W Series Spielberg round was the first round of seven in the 2021 W Series, and took place at the Red Bull Ring in Austria on 26 June 2021. The event was an undercard to the 2021 Formula One World Championship round at the same circuit.

Report

Background
Six new drivers entered the championship having successfully applied for entry into the cancelled 2020 season – Ayla Ågren, Abbie Eaton, Belén García, Nerea Martí, Irina Sidorkova and Bruna Tomaselli. All drivers that finished outside the top 14 in the 2019 season left the championship, with 11 of the top 12 automatically qualifying as full-time entries for 2021. South African driver Tasmin Pepper, who finished 10th in the 2019 championship, was retained as a reserve driver due to complications with her visa given the nature of the COVID-19 pandemic in South Africa – as were Caitlin Wood and Gosia Rdest, who finished 13th and 14th in the 2019 series respectively, and Abbi Pulling, a British F4 driver who did not go through any evaluation process. Naomi Schiff, who raced in 2019, was named as a reserve driver but was maintained largely in a media role.

The championship employed a team system for 2021; all cars were still operated by one outfit – Double R Racing operating as Fine Moments in 2021 as opposed to Hitech Grand Prix in 2019 – but the drivers were split into 2-car teams for marketing and sponsorship purposes. Veloce, Puma, Forbes, Sirin and The Bunker bought into the program, and the remaining four teams were W Series themed – Écurie W, Scuderia W, Racing X and the W Series Academy; the latter for the series' youngest drivers and offering them a two-year scholarship. The Puma team chose to rotate their second seat between the series' reserve drivers, with Gosia Rdest driving in the first two rounds.

Race
Alice Powell led the field away from pole position. Rookie Belén García went around the outside of 2019 runner-up Beitske Visser at turn 3 on the opening lap and put herself up into the podium places. Reigning champion Jamie Chadwick started in a lowly 8th, but fought her way into the top 5 by the end of the first lap – only to be collected by Powell's team-mate Jessica Hawkins at turn 1 and half-spun, dropping her to 16th. Scuderia W team-mates Sarah Moore and Belén García then began to fight over second place as Powell skipped away, with García proving her inexperience having first run wide at turn 3 and then having a much larger off at turn 6, rejoining behind Miki Koyama in 9th. Koyama was embroiled in a battle with Marta García and Bruna Tomaselli, however the older García's race was curtailed with 10 minutes remaining after mechanical problems - her stranded Puma entry bringing out the safety car.

Chadwick had failed to make progress through the field after the incident with Hawkins, but a four-minute dash to the flag proved critical. Visser and Emma Kimiläinen, who had inherited the battle for 3rd after Belén García's off, collided at turn 3 – resulting in a broken front wing for the Finn and no points for Visser. In attempting to avoid the incident, Tomaselli slowed down and was spun by Vittoria Piria, also dropping to the back. Kimiläinen did not pit to fix her wing, resulting in a squabble at the back of the top ten – in which Piria collided with Abbie Eaton at the same turn a lap later and the damage to the Italian's car proved terminal. Kimiläinen's wing came off the car as she began the final lap, and nearly flew into the path of Sabré Cook.

Powell led the race from start to finish and claimed back-to-back victories after her win in the last round of the 2019 season at Brands Hatch. Moore remained a comfortable second and Fabienne Wohlwend avoided all the incidents to finish 3rd having started 9th, however only narrowly beat a recovering Belén García to the line. Chadwick meanwhile made up nine spots in the late-race drama to finish in 6th, her worst finish in a points-paying W Series race. Jessica Hawkins had finished in 5th on the road, but was demoted to 16th and the last classified finisher after her incident with Chadwick earned her a 30-second penalty.

Classification

Practice

Qualifying

Race

 – Hawkins was given a 30-second post-race time penalty for causing a collision.

Championship standings

See also
 2021 Styrian Grand Prix

Notes

References

External links
 Official website
 Race replay

|- style="text-align:center"
|width="35%"|Previous race:
|width="30%"|W Series2021 season
|width="40%"|Next race:

W Series Spielberg 1
W Series Spielberg 1
Spielberg 1
W Series Spielberg 1